The 1991 NCAA Division I-AA football rankings are from the NCAA Division I-AA football committee.  This is for the 1991 season.

Legend

NCAA Division I-AA Football Committee poll

References

Rankings
NCAA Division I FCS football rankings